Henri-Nompar de Caumont, duc de La Force (1582 – January 1678) was Duc de La Force and peer of France.  He was the son of Marshal of France, Jacques-Nompar de Caumont, duc de La Force and Charlotte de Gontaut, daughter of Marshal Armand de Gontaut, baron de Biron. First marquis de Castelnau, later Duc de La Force after the death of his brother, he served King Louis XIII on many occasions in the army, under his father, as Maréchal-de-camp.

Marriage and issue
He married 17 October 1602, Marguerite d'Escodeca, dame de Boësse, and by her had nine children:

 Jacques de Caumont La Force, marquis de Boësse, killed in the siege of La Mothe in Lorraine in 1634
 Henri de Caumont La Force, died young
 Pierre de Caumont La Force, marquis de Cugnac, without issue
 Armand de Caumont La Force, marquis de Montpouillan, Lieutenant-general in the Dutch Army, Governor of Naarden, died in The Hague on 16 May 1701 at the age of 86. He married Amable-Guillelmine de Brederode and Grace Angelique Arrazola de Oñate.
 Charlotte de Caumont La Force, married Gabriel de Caumont, comte de Lauzun, mother of Antoine Nompar de Caumont 
 Diane de Caumont La Force, married Charles-René du Puy de Tournon, marquis de Montbrun en Dauphiné  
 Jeanne de Caumont La Force, married Cyrus de Montaut, marquis de Navailles, seigneur de Beynac 
 Jacqueline de Caumont La Force, died, 10 May 1702, married Henri de Vivant, comte de Panjas.
 Henriette de Caumont La Force, demoiselle de Castelnau

Death
He died in January 1678 at the Château de La Force in the Dordogne, and was succeeded by his grandson, Jacques-Nompar.

Footnotes

Sources

External links
 Henri Nompar de Caumont La Force Family tree
 Seigneurs de Caumont-La Force Lineage of the lords of Caumont and Dukes of La Force

1582 births
1678 deaths
Dukes of La Force
French marquesses
French soldiers
17th-century peers of France